The Cariboo Prospector or Cariboo Dayliner or The BC Rail Budd cars was a passenger train service in British Columbia, Canada, which used Budd Rail Diesel Car trains. It was operated by the Pacific Great Eastern, later known as the British Columbia Railway Company and then BC Rail. The train ran from BC Rail's North Vancouver railway station, the one located a few blocks from the current North Vancouver railway station used by the Rocky Mountaineer, and ran to Lillooet railway station. From there a section was split from the train that would continue down to Prince George BC Rail station located in BC Rail's Prince George yards. This train service ended along with the other BC Rail passenger services in 2002. A section serving the line between Lillooet, Seton Portage, and D'Arcy was replaced by the Koaham Shuttle.

References

External links
 Video Prince George - Vancouver YouTube

Passenger rail transport in British Columbia
Named passenger trains of Canada
Railway services discontinued in 2002